This is a list of films that are based on books about crime. Films are listed according to the decade in which the depicted crime occurred, rather than by the film's date of release.

This page includes "crimes" where the "criminal" was later exonerated. This page includes suicides or other deaths which have been deemed to be suspicious by some and have therefore become the subject of conspiracy theories.

12th century

England

Frequently filmed: A Morbid Taste for Bones and sequels

 * TV movie

Japan

14th century

Italy

16th century

England

Anne Boleyn adultery and treason
1536

Thomas More case

Scotland

Sawney Bean legend

17th century

United States

Frequently filmed: The Scarlet Letter

Salem witch trials
1692–1693

Frequently filmed: The Crucible

 ♠ The Witches of Salem has an adapted screenplay by Jean-Paul Sartre.

18th century

France

Frequently filmed: Le Bossu

Affair of the Diamond Necklace
1785

Great Britain

Frequently filmed: Doctor Syn and sequels

Frequently filmed: Moll Flanders

Württemberg

Joseph Süß Oppenheimer case
1737

Bulletin ... upcoming film: Jew Suss: Rise and Fall by Oskar Roehler

19th century

Australia
For bushrangers, see List of films based on westerns.

Brazil
For cangaceiros, see List of films based on westerns.

Canada

For Mounties, see List of films based on westerns.

France

Corsica

Eugène François Vidocq and la Sûreté

Dreyfus Affair
See List of films based on war books — peace.

Joseph Vacher case
1894–1897

India

Suppression of the Thugs

Russia

Frequently filmed: The Winter Queen and sequels

 * TV miniseries

United Kingdom

Twice filmed: Gaslight

Wreckers

Cato Street Conspiracy
February 1820

Burke and Hare case
1827–1828

Twice filmed: "The Body Snatcher"

Great Gold Robbery of 1855
15 May 1855

Whitechapel murders
1888–1891 (Jack the Ripper)

Frequently filmed: The Lodger

United States
For outlaws and lawmen, see List of films based on westerns.

Frequently filmed: "The Tell-Tale Heart"

 α Animated film

Assassination of Abraham Lincoln
14 April 1865
See List of films based on war books — 1775–1898.
See also Assassinations in fiction.

Impeachment of Andrew Johnson
24 February 1868

Lizzie Borden case
4 August 1892

1900s

United States

Chester Gillette case
11 July 1906

Twice filmed: An American Tragedy
The novel was the subject of an unproduced 1930 screenplay by Sergei Eisenstein.

1910s

France

Henri Désiré Landru case
1914–1918

United Kingdom

Doctor Crippen case
after 31 January 1910

1920s

France

Frequently filmed: L'Affaire Crainquebille

Germany

Peter Kürten case
1929

United States

Bobby Franks murder
21 May 1924 (Leopold and Loeb)

Death of Thomas Ince
19 November 1924

Scopes Monkey Trial
1925

Frequently filmed: Inherit the Wind

Al Capone era
1925–1931

St. Valentine's Day Massacre
14 February 1929

Ruth Snyder case
20 March 1927

1930s

Algeria

Frequently filmed: Pépé le Moko

France

Papin Sisters case
2 February 1933

Twice filmed: A Judgement in Stone

Japan

Sada Abe case
18 May 1936

United States

Scottsboro Boys case
23 April 1931

Lindbergh kidnapping
1 March 1932

Frequently filmed: Murder on the Orient Express

William D. Lundy murder
[informative page deleted over copyright violations] 
9 December 1932

1940s

Austria

Bahamas

Sir Harry Oakes murder
7 July 1943

Canada

Edwin Alonzo Boyd era
1949–1952 (Boyd Gang)

 * TV movie

France

Doctor Petiot case
before 31 October 1944

Italy

Salvatore Giuliano era

Portella della Ginestra massacre
1 May 1947

Pleasure Island

Frequently filmed: The Adventures of Pinocchio

 ♠ A young innocent is deceived by swindlers and sold into slavery.
 α Animated film

Kenya

Happy Valley murder
1941

Newfoundland

United States

Sleepy Lagoon murder
2 August 1942

Black Dahlia murder
c. 15 January 1947

West Germany

1950s

Canada

France

United Kingdom

Stone of Scone theft
25 December 1950 (Christmas Day robbery of a church)

Ruth Ellis case
1955

United States

Great Brink's Robbery
17 January 1950

Coleman Peterson case
31 July 1952

Ed Gein case
1957

Frequently filmed: Psycho

Suicide of George Reeves
16 June 1959

Clutter Family murders
15 November 1959

1960s

Argentina

San Fernando bank robbery
1965 

 ♣ The robbery took place in Argentina; the pursuit ended in Uruguay.

France

 ♠ The film was remade for television in 2005 as Joseph.

Sweden

Frequently filmed: Roseanna and sequels

 Δ The film adaptation changes the setting from Stockholm to San Francisco.

Turkey

Topkapı Museum

United Kingdom

Profumo affair
1963

Uruguay

San Fernando bank robbery getaway
1965

 ♣ The robbery took place in Argentina; the pursuit ended in Uruguay.

United States

Clarence Earl Gideon case
3 June 1961

Ian James Campbell murder
9 March 1963

Boston Strangler case
1962–1964

Assassination of John F. Kennedy
22 November 1963

Bulletin ... film currently in development: Reclaiming History

 ♣ Lane is credited as screenwriter, rather than as author.
 ♦ Bugliosi's preparation for the televised "trial" of deceased defendant Oswald became the book Reclaiming History.
 ♠ The authors are credited as technical advisors on JFK.
 ♥ Prouty's book has an introduction by Oliver Stone.
 * TV special
 ** TV miniseries
 δ Documentary
 † Dramatized documentary

See also Assassinations in fiction.

Kitty Genovese murder
13 March 1964

Sylvia Likens murder
26 October 1965

Richard Speck case
13 July 1966

Tate–LaBianca murders
1969 (Manson Family)

Zodiac case

1970s

Canada

Helen Betty Osborne murder
13 November 1971

 * TV movie

Guyana

Jonestown Massacre
18 November 1978

Italy

Sweden

Norrmalmstorg bank robbery
23–28 August 1973 (Stockholm syndrome)

United Kingdom

Bulletin ... film now in production: Straw Dogs by Rod Lurie

Baker Street bank robbery
11 September 1971

What if ...

 ♠ The earliest editions of the novel did not contain a glossary, or any indication that the slang was based on Russian.

United States

New England

 ♠ The film, shot in Bennington, Vermont, involves a "bank in a remote town in New England"."Catamount" is an infrequently used term for a cougar, but here refers to the fictitious town.

Jeffrey MacDonald case
17 February 1970

 ** TV miniseries

Knapp Commission on NYPD corruption
1970–1972

Watergate burglary
17 June 1972

 * TV movie

Gay Brooklyn bank robbery
22 August 1972

Ted Bundy case
1974–1978

 * TV movie

Frank Lucas case
before 1975

Martha Moxley murder
31 October 1975

 * TV movie

Hillside Strangler case
1977–1978

 * TV movie

Bob Crane murder
29 June 1978

What if ...

 * TV movie

1980s

Australia

Azaria Chamberlain disappearance
17 August 1980 (dingo baby abduction)

Canada

 * TV movie

Colin Thatcher case
21 January 1983

Montreal Massacre
6 December 1989

France

Roberto Succo case
1980s

India

Phoolan Devi case

Iran

Soraya M. case
1986

Mexico

Enrique Camarena murder
9 February 1985

 ** TV miniseries

Soviet Union

Andrei Chikatilo case
1978–1990

 * TV movie

What if ...

 ♠ In this version, the murderer, renamed Evilenko, has psychic powers.

United States

Doctor Tarnower murder
10 March 1980 (Scarsdale Diet author death)

 * TV movie

John Lennon murder
8 December 1980

See also Assassinations in fiction.

Lawrencia "Bambi" Bembenek case
28 May 1981

 * TV movie

Henry Lee Lucas case
before 11 June 1983

Alan Berg murder
18 June 1984

See also Assassinations in fiction.

Exxon Valdez disaster
23 March 1989

West Germany

1990s

Australia

Belgium

Canada

Paul Bernardo case
up to 1992

France

India

Bombay bombings of 1993
12 March 1993

Singapore

Barings Bank collapse
1995

Spain

 ♠ A crossword puzzle writer becomes involved in a bizarre mystery in Seville.

United Kingdom

James Bulger murder
12 February 1993

 ♠ The principal connection to the Bulger case appears to be the youthfulness of the convicted boys.

United States

Suicide of Vince Foster
20 July 1993

Vietnam

2000s

Aruba

Natalee Holloway disappearance
30 May 2005

 * TV movie

Brazil

Italy

Mexico

South Korea

Hwaseong serial murders

United States

 д Decade when story occurs is presumed.
 ** TV miniseries

Valerie Plame exposure
14 July 2003

Bulletin ... upcoming film: Fair Game by Doug Liman

Political crimes
For political prisoners, see List of films based on civics books.

Drug trade
For traffickers, see above.
For addicts, see List of films based on civics books.

Prisons
For punishment and prisons, see List of films based on civics books.

References

Notes

Bibliography
Kamp, David with Lawrence Levi. The Film Snob's Dictionary. Broadway Books, New York, 2006.
Lavington, Stephen. Virgin Film: Oliver Stone, Virgin Books, London, 2004.

See also
 Assassinations in fiction
Pages with the same format
 List of films based on arts books
 List of films based on civics books
 List of films based on film books
 List of films based on sports books
 List of films based on spy books
 List of films based on war books
 List of films based on westerns

   Return to top of page.

Lists of films based on books